Minnesota 13 was the name given to the corn liquor moonshine distilled on many  central  Minnesota  Stearns County farms.  It became well known across America and Canada as "Minnesota 13", a premium quality twice distilled and properly aged whiskey, (said by many to taste remarkably like "Canadian Club"). 
Stearns County was populated  predominantly by German and Polish Catholics at that time. Holdingford was considered the unofficial moonshine capital of Minnesota.

One story for the origin of the name says it came from a producer who hand-lettered his labels because he was proud of his product.  Minnesota 13 was the name of an open pollinated corn variety developed by the University of Minnesota and used in Stearns County because of its shorter growing season. 

Eventually, Federal agents managed to sharply curtail the large-scale manufacturing of moonshine in Stearns County. They succeeded by burning barns and sheds and through various acts of intimidation. They exploited divisions within the community by using informers and they undermined the tip system by sharpening their raiding strategies. Increased surveillance and a bigger stick to punish in the form of Jones Law finally blunted community resistance.

However, while they managed to alter behavior, they failed to change beliefs. Stearns County had its revenge when it voted 4 to 1 for repeal of the hated 18th amendment to the US Constitution.   A number of books on local history refer to Minnesota 13 and its importance of helping people through tough times.  The only book on the subject is  Minnesota 13: Stearns County's Wet  Wild Prohibition Days by Elaine Davis published in 2007.

References

Additional References
 Elaine Davis Minnesota 13 Stearns County's 'Wet'  Wild Prohibition Days, Sweet Grass Publishing (2007)  
 Robert J Voigt  "Opoliana",  Sentinel Printing co.  1987
 Robert J Voigt  "The People of St. Wendel"  (1867–1992), Park Press  1992
 Robert J. Voigt  "The Arban Way  " A History of the Parish at Arban, Minnesota 1873-1973
 Vincent Arthur Yzermans The Ford in the River, Park Press. 397 pages    (1985)
 M Hatten "Stearns County has moonshine in its history"  St. Cloud Times  2007-9 10
 "Look in grab bag of local history"  St. Cloud Times Retrieved on 2007-07-21
 Marilyn Salzl Brinkman "local moonshine popular nationwide" St. Cloud Times  2008-05-10

External links
 City of Holdingford
 Minnesota 13’ Corn - Background and Importance of ‘Minnesota 13’ Corn
  KVSC news Minnesota_13podcast
 Minnesota 13 - web site
 Holdingford Area Historical Society

German-American culture in Minnesota
Minnesota culture
Moonshine
Organized crime in Minnesota
Polish-American culture in Minnesota
Whiskies of the United States